John Frederick, Margrave of Brandenburg-Ansbach (18 October 1654 – 22 March 1686) succeeded his father Albert II as margrave of Ansbach in 1667. He married his second wife Princess Eleonore Erdmuthe of Saxe-Eisenach on 4 November 1681. Their daughter Wilhelmine Charlotte Caroline, Margravine of Brandenburg-Ansbach (Caroline of Ansbach) married George II of Great Britain before he became king.

Issue
By Margravine Johanna Elisabeth of Baden-Durlach, daughter of Frederick VI, Margrave of Baden-Durlach, and his wife Christina Magdalena of the Palatinate-Zweibrücken:

Margrave Leopold Frederick of Brandenburg-Ansbach (29 May 1674 – 21 August 1676) died in infancy.
Margrave Christian Albert of Brandenburg-Ansbach (18 September 1675 – 16 October 1692) died unmarried.
Margravine Dorothea Friederike of Brandenburg-Ansbach (12 August 1676 – 13 March 1731) married Johann Reinhard III of Hanau-Lichtenberg and had issue, including Charlotte of Hanau, wife of Louis VIII, Landgrave of Hesse-Darmstadt
Margrave George Frederick of Brandenburg-Ansbach (3 May 1678 – 29 March 1703) died unmarried.
Margravine Charlotte Sophie of Brandenburg-Ansbach (29 June 1679 – 24 January 1680) died in infancy.

By Princess Eleonore Erdmuthe of Saxe-Eisenach:

Margravine Caroline of Brandenburg-Ansbach (1 March 1683 – 20 November 1737) married George II of Great Britain and had issue.
Margrave Frederick Augustus of Brandenburg-Ansbach (3 January 1685 – 30 January 1685) died in infancy.
Margrave William Frederick of Brandenburg-Ansbach (8 January 1686 – 7 January 1723) married Duchess Christiane Charlotte of Württemberg, daughter of Frederick Charles, Duke of Württemberg-Winnental and had issue.

Ancestors

Notes and sources 

Johann Friedrich, Margrave of Brandenburg-Ansbach
Johann Friedrich, Margrave of Brandenburg-Ansbach
1654 births
1686 deaths